Talk is the debut studio album by Australian artist Daniel Johns. It was his first full-length musical project since the hiatus of Silverchair and was announced in May 2011, but the album was not released until 22 May 2015 by record label Eleven, and it debuted at No. 2 on the Australian ARIA Albums Chart. The tracks "Aerial Love", "Cool on Fire" and "Going on 16" were released  as singles.

Recording 
Talk was created over the course of 2013 and 2014, with Johns actively pursuing a sleek neo soul R&B feel, influenced by artists such as Janet Jackson. While working with long-time collaborator Julian Hamilton, Johns also engaged the involvement of numerous production personnel—such as Lorde producer Joel Little—as well as Styalz Fuego and M-Phazes.

Release 
A four-song single, "Aerial Love", featuring two tracks—"Aerial Love" and "Preach"—that would feature on the album, was released on 13 March 2015, reaching No. 21 in the Australian singles chart, giving Johns his first solo hit. Talk was released on 22 May 2015 by record label Eleven in Johns' native Australia, and worldwide in digital and CD formats. It reached number 2 on the Australian ARIA Albums Chart. The album also achieved some unexpected success in other parts of the world, coming in at No. 1 on the Slovakian iTunes albums chart shortly after release.

Reception 

Like much of Johns' work, Talk marked a dramatic shift in musical styles, garnering polarized feedback from fans, although critical reactions were warm. In his review for AllMusic, Neil Z. Yeung declared that, Talk "is cohesive, ebbing and flowing as the grooves pulsate and Johns' lyrics of love and lust hypnotize. This is the sound of a grown man taking a stand, declaring his identity as an evolving artist in a new era."

Track listing

Personnel 
 Daniel Johns – vocals, keyboards, guitars
 Maxime Bibeau – bass
 Satu Vänskä – violin
 Ilya Isakovich – violin
 Christopher Moore – viola
 Alexandru-Mihai Bota – viola
 Julian Thompson – cello
 Timo-Veikko Valve – cello
 Julian Hamilton – keyboards
 Damian – keyboards
 The Australian Chamber Orchestra – strings

Charts

References 

2015 debut albums
Daniel Johns albums
Eleven: A Music Company albums